Jozef Martin Paul van Brabant (5 November 1942 – 18 October 2006) was a Belgian American economist.  He was Principal Economic Affairs Officer at the Secretariat of the United Nations in New York.  His major academic interest had been in the economics of the planned and transition economies of Eastern Europe and in the economic aspects of the remaking Europe.

Life
Jozef van Brabant was born on 5 November 1942 in Hasselt, Belgium to Leon Elise and Victorina van Brabant. After completing his undergraduate studies in business, economics, philosophy, mathematics and teaching at the Katholieke Universiteit van Leuven in Belgium,  Jozef M. van Brabant went to the US and received a M.A. degree in Russian and Eastern European Studies in 1967 and a Ph.D. degree in Economics from Yale University in 1973. After a brief academic career in Belgium and Germany he joined the United Nations Secretariat in New York in 1975 and retired in the first years of the 21st century  as one of its Principal Economic Affairs Officers.  He was noted for his quasi-academic career, which included delivering lectures and participation in conferences in Europe, America and Asia.  He also taught at the European University Institute in Florence, Italy.  Jozef van Brabant was widely regarded as  economic expert on Eastern Europe. In his free time he wrote and published extensively on the centrally planned economies in Eastern Europe, their so-called annus mirabilis of 1989, their transition to market economies and integration with the European Union. Jozef M. van Brabant was the author of seventeen books and more than 200 articles in American and European academic journals and collected volumes.

Jozef M. van Brabant never became a US citizen and was a staunch supporter of European integration.  He was survived by his wife, Miyuki van Brabant, a retired librarian,  daughters Katja J. and Anja J.,  and four grandchildren.

Selected bibliography

References

External links

 
 

1942 births
2006 deaths
Flemish academics
Catholic University of Leuven (1834–1968) alumni
Belgian emigrants to the United States
Yale Graduate School of Arts and Sciences alumni
20th-century Belgian economists
Belgian officials of the United Nations